Ravine is a census-designated place (CDP) in Schuylkill County, Pennsylvania, United States. The population was 629 at the 2000 census.

Geography
Ravine is located at  (40.567729, -76.392063).

Demographics
At the 2000 census there were 629 people, 271 households, and 195 families living in the CDP. The population density was 584.7 people per square mile (224.9/km). There were 281 housing units at an average density of 261.2/sq mi (100.5/km).  The racial makeup of the CDP was 98.89% White, 0.64% Asian, and 0.48% from two or more races.
Of the 271 households 27.7% had children under the age of 18 living with them, 51.3% were married couples living together, 14.0% had a female householder with no husband present, and 28.0% were non-families. 23.2% of households were one person and 12.2% were one person aged 65 or older. The average household size was 2.32 and the average family size was 2.68.

The age distribution was 21.9% under the age of 18, 7.6% from 18 to 24, 28.8% from 25 to 44, 23.8% from 45 to 64, and 17.8% 65 or older. The median age was 40 years. For every 100 females, there were 85.5 males. For every 100 females age 18 and over, there were 81.9 males.

The median household income was $30,739 and the median family income  was $41,563. Males had a median income of $30,833 versus $25,179 for females. The per capita income for the CDP was $16,297. About 11.6% of families and 15.0% of the population were below the poverty line, including 36.4% of those under age 18 and none of those age 65 or over.

References

Census-designated places in Schuylkill County, Pennsylvania
Census-designated places in Pennsylvania